Kaslo is a village on the west shore of Kootenay Lake in the West Kootenay region of southeastern British Columbia. A member municipality of the Central Kootenay Regional District, the name derives from the adjacent Kaslo River. At 2016, the population was 968, and the idyllic village is regarded at the "Little Switzerland of Canada."

Thousands of years before the arrival of European settlers on Kootenay Lake, indigenous nations made this country their home. Two nations, the Kutenai (Ktunaxa) and Lakes (Sinixt) lived a semi-nomadic existence, using their intimate knowledge of the land to follow its seasonal cycles for root harvesting, berry picking, fishing and hunting. Settlers came and used it as a sawmill site in 1889, but soon after Kaslo expanded as a result of the silver boom of the late 19th century. It retains much of the historic atmosphere from its earlier mining days. The economy of Kaslo today is based mainly on the forestry and tourism industries.

Mining
Kaslo was an important centre for shipping silver ore from mines in the area. In 1895, it became the eastern terminus for the Kaslo and Slocan Railway.

Kaslo's fortunes faded after the end of the silver rush, and the widespread collapse of mining activity following World War I, but the growth in fruit farming and logging partially offset this decline.

Community

After the 1891 townsite survey, building lots were marketed. Kaslo was incorporated as a city on August 14, 1893, making it the oldest incorporated community in the Kootenays. Destroyed by the 1894 flood, the townsite was rebuilt. At the time, the population was about 3,000.

The Kaslo Kootenian, a newspaper established in 1896, existed at least into the mid 1950s. The settlement was re-incorporated as a village on January 1, 1959.

Demographics 

National historic Sites
Kaslo is home to two National Historic Sites of Canada:
 The SS Moyie, which worked on Kootenay Lake from 1889 until 1957, found a permanent home on Front Street in Kaslo. Restored by the Kootenay Lake Historical Society, it is the oldest intact sternwheeler in the world and draws thousands of visitors every year.
 Village Hall, built in 1898, is one of only two intact wooden municipal buildings that are still in use in Canada.

Attractions

 Many health and wellness facilities and professionals including The Sentinel and Wing Creek Resort as well as neighbouring Johnsons Landing Retreat Center, Yasodhara Ashram and Ainsworth Hot Springs. 
 The Kootenay Lake Innovation Centre is a non-profit that is fostering growth of creative events, civic engagement and technology development.
 The Langham a former grand hotel was built in the mid 1890’s. Now Langham Cultural Society is a charitable public arts heritage centre and Japanese Canadian Museum.
 The Kaslo Golf Club is a 9-hole course which plays as a 2,824-yard, men's par 35, women's par 37 course. Kaslo's Golf Club dates back to 1923, when locals invested and donated their efforts and created a 4-hole course. This makes it one of the oldest in British Columbia. A new timberframe clubhouse was built in 2007.
 The Kaslo Jazz Etc. Festival, held every August long weekend in Kaslo Bay Park, is a music event which attracts international performers and draws large audiences.

Japanese internment
In 1941, Kaslo was selected as one of many sites throughout BC for the internment of Japanese Canadians. 964 Japanese Canadians were relocated to Kaslo in 1942, before being moved to New Denver in 1946.

Television
Kaslo has been featured on the historical television series Gold Trails and Ghost Towns (season 2, episode 2). Kaslo was also featured in the 1995 film Magic in the Water, starring Mark Harmon and Joshua Jackson, as well as in Tougher Than It Looks, starring Glenn Erikson in 2017.

Climate
Kaslo has a humid continental climate (Dfb) or an inland oceanic climate (Cfb) depending on the isotherm used.

Notable People

References

External links

Populated places in the West Kootenay
Villages in British Columbia
World War II internment camps in Canada